Fake Princess (Chinese: 山寨小萌主, Pinyin: Shānzhài Xiǎo Méng Zhǔ) is a 2020 Chinese television series starring Zhao Yiqin, Eleanor Lee, Garvey Jin and Chen Si Yu. The series aired on Mango TV from May 17 to June 1, 2020.

Synopsis 
For a chest full of gold, Chang Le agrees to marry a duplicitous prince, marking the start of a beautiful romance.

Chang Le is no longer free and untameable, having become the fake bride of Crown Prince Li Che. Once settled in the palace, she routinely faces humiliation. Despite this uncomfortable situation, she adapts like a feral cat showing its true stripes. Li Che who has planned out every step meticulously, slowly  finds himself attracted by Chang Le's liveliness. Despite wearing masks to hide their true intentions, they both of them manage to find comfort in each other.

Cast

Main 

 Eleanor Lee as Duan Chang Le/ Liu Yu Yao 
 A female bandit who is very greedy for money. Because she looks similar to  the Prime Minister's granddaughter, Liu Yu Yao, she is bought off for a box of gold. She enters the palace by mistake and marries the Crown Prince.
 Zhao Yiqin as Crown Prince Li Che
 The son of the former empress Shen Yu Jin, he was named Crown Prince at an early age, and is deep and wise.
 Garvey Jin as Li Heng
 The son of Empress Liu and the 5th son of the Emperor. Gentle, talented and extremely filial, Li Heng is a devoted prince, and will do anything for his love.
 Chen Si Yu as Gong Sun Mo
 He is completely loyal to the crown prince. He grew up with the Crown Prince when he was young, and he suffered constantly in order to save the Prince.

Supporting 

 Wang Yi Tian as Nong Ying/ Liu Shuang Shuang
 Liu Yu Yao’s personal maid, she is ruthless and prefers to be silent.
 Sun Xue Ning as Zhu Yan
 She is Li Heng's love interest. But because her family supports the Crown Prince, she and Li Heng are forbidden to be together.
 Zhang Xin Ning as Empress Liu Hai Jao
 Ambitious and evil, she is a woman who longs for power. She is the mother of Li Heng and the aunt of Liu Yu Yao.  
 Jeremy Wang as Li Lu
 Li Lu is the son of Noble Consort Wang and the 7th son of the Emperor. He shares a close relationship with Li Heng and even helps him to meet with Zhu Yan.

Others 

 Guan Xuan as Emperor Li Chang Ye
 Lan Cheng as Liu Sheng
 Xu Xin as Liu Han Si
 Shao Jia as Qin Fei Yu
 Amber Song as Princess Ali Aiti of Ye Ming
 Guo Zhen as General Shen Ao
 Zhu Peng Chen as Gongsun Zhen Qing
 Wang Kuan Yu as Shen Zi
 Zhang Zi Han as Shi Tou (Bandit)
 Kong Bi Yu as a Bandit
 Han Zhi Gang as San Shu (Bandit)
 Yang Nuo as Zhang Meng (Bandit)
 Liu Yue Tao as Chen Qing Lan (Zhu Yan's cousin)
 Xu Yan Yu as Ye Tao Hua (rape victim)
 Bai Xiao Hong as Aunt Luo (Peach blossom villager)
 Yang Yu Lan as Nong Ying's mother
 Han Jian Hua as Taoist Priest
 Bai Li Wei as Physician Xue
 Wan Xin Yan as Lady Dong
 Jenna Wang as Duan Nian'er
 Liu Guo Ji as Bai Shi Tong
 Wang Zi Qing as Empress Shen Yu Jin
 Li Hai Dong as Lao Zhang
 Zhao Cong as Gang Ban
 Kong Xiang Fu as Green clothed youth
 Ivan Xu as Wang Dong Jie

References 
Fake Princess Review - First Impression : Not Worth It For Me
Fake Princess (冒牌太子妃) Synopsis And Cast: Chinese Drama
Sugar Baby’s Review Corner: Fake Princess

Chinese television series
2020 Chinese television series debuts
Mango TV original programming